The MTV Asia Awards was the Asian equivalent of the European MTV EMA. Held from 2002 to 2008, the show gave recognition and awards to Asian and international artists in achievement, cinema, fashion, humanitarian, and music. Just like the EMAs, most of the awards were voted by viewers from the Asian region.

The trophy design was a gold toblerone-like bar. The twin prism shape represents the letter M and double A, the acronyms for MTV Asia Awards.

The show was absent in 2007 and was discontinued after 2008.

Ceremonies

Categories

Viewers' choice awards

Regional awards
 Favorite Artist Mainland China
 Favorite Artist Hong Kong
 Favorite Artist India
 Favorite Artist Indonesia
 Favorite Artist Korea
 Favorite Artist Malaysia
 Favorite Artist Philippines
 Favorite Artist Singapore
 Favorite Artist Taiwan
 Favorite Artist Thailand

International awards
Favorite Breakthrough Artist
Favorite Female Artist
Favorite Male Artist
Favorite Pop Act
Favorite Rock Act
Favorite Video

Special awards

References

 
Asian music
Asian music awards
Awards established in 2002
Awards disestablished in 2008